Tityus stigmurus is a species of scorpion from the family Buthidae that can be found in Brazil. It takes them a year to mature into an adult, which makes them a fast-growing species. They also have a dark stripe over the mesosoma with either yellowish or orange pedipalps.

Diet
In captivity this species is fed on cockroaches and crickets. It is suggested that Shelfordella lateralis is a good species of cockroaches, that are abundant worldwide. Aside from being abundant they also are the easiest prey, since they don't hide, and the scorpion can easily eat them.

Distribution 
This species is predominantly found in the northeastern parts of Brazil, especially in the Caatinga region. The presence of this species has also been reported in a number of other Brazilian states.{
  "type": "FeatureCollection",
  "features": [
    {
      "type": "Feature",
      "properties": {},
      "geometry": {
        "type": "Polygon",
        "coordinates": [
          [
            [
              -39.195173,
              -18.192602
            ],
            [
              -40.811882,
              -17.321208
            ],
            [
              -39.898091,
              -15.97256
            ],
            [
              -42.780056,
              -14.614765
            ],
            [
              -45.802608,
              -14.682862
            ],
            [
              -46.224358,
              -12.081134
            ],
            [
              -46.856986,
              -10.632047
            ],
            [
              -45.872899,
              -9.870187
            ],
            [
              -45.802608,
              -8.06264
            ],
            [
              -44.326475,
              -7.085873
            ],
            [
              -42.990934,
              -6.037042
            ],
            [
              -42.990934,
              -4.495173
            ],
            [
              -41.936556,
              -2.950036
            ],
            [
              -39.898091,
              -3.020328
            ],
            [
              -37.929917,
              -4.28464
            ],
            [
              -35.891452,
              -4.916054
            ],
            [
              -34.837074,
              -6.73651
            ],
            [
              -34.626202,
              -9.037056
            ],
            [
              -36.242911,
              -10.42445
            ],
            [
              -37.789335,
              -12.287529
            ],
            [
              -38.843713,
              -13.864334
            ],
            [
              -39.195173,
              -18.192602
            ]
          ]
        ]
      }
    },
    {
      "type": "Feature",
      "properties": {},
      "geometry": {
        "type": "Polygon",
        "coordinates": [
          [
            [
              -44.959103,
              -23.45317
            ],
            [
              -44.045306,
              -22.741013
            ],
            [
              -46.224358,
              -22.805907
            ],
            [
              -46.997567,
              -21.174391
            ],
            [
              -47.841073,
              -20.1206
            ],
            [
              -50.441869,
              -19.856024
            ],
            [
              -51.636834,
              -21.04307
            ],
            [
              -52.761503,
              -22.285871
            ],
            [
              -53.183253,
              -23.065187
            ],
            [
              -50.723038,
              -22.870774
            ],
            [
              -49.879538,
              -23.646736
            ],
            [
              -49.036032,
              -24.993592
            ],
            [
              -48.122241,
              -25.312142
            ],
            [
              -44.959103,
              -23.45317
            ]
          ]
        ]
      }
    }
  ]
}

As a pet
The species could be housed as pets, and they can live with each other communally once into their 2nd instar. Mothers tend to eat the young on case-by-case basis. Another thing to consider if owning such species is that they need something to climb on. A cork bark is a nice climbing tool for such species if the owner will lean it against the side of the enclosure or layer it to provide ample climbing space. Artificial limbs can be used too, since the same tool is used for reptiles and aquariums alike. Peat moss must be provided, even though the species are not burrowers. The owner is responsible for keeping the moss clean every two weeks. Scorpions of this species do not require water, since they acquire moisture from their prey. The temperature in the container must be at 75–90 °F or 24–32 °C for the species to survive and reproduce.

Reproduction
The species is facultatively parthenogenetic. The females give birth in 3 months, with the period being as long as 4–5 months. Various gestation periods are different, and can take maximum from 9–12 months. The gestation can be shortened if the temperature is warm enough. The brood size is from 2–16, with an average of 8.

Emergency sting procedures
The species is venomous, and therefore shouldn't be disturbed. T. stigmurus has a recorded LD50 of 0.575 mg/ kg in mice, which is significant. In the state of Bahia, Brazil, in a period from January 1982 to December 1995, 237 patients proven to be stung by Tityus stigmurus, of these 237, information on symptoms was obtained from only 90 patients, symptoms in another 147 patients were not published, the symptoms were classified as local (pain, numbness, erythema, edema, paraesthesia, spot lesion, hyperemia, anesthesia, itching, wheal, burning, flushing and cramping), general (headache, sweating, cold extremities, hypothermia, ocular congestion and cyanosis), digestive (vomiting and nausea), neurological (tremors, agitation, difficulty moving, contractures and dizziness), cardiovascular (hypotension) and respiratory (dyspnea). Other systemic symptoms reported by this species include diaphoresis, somnolence, tachycardia, sialorrhea, pallor, convulsions, abdominal pain, tachypnea, bradycardia, chills, fainting and hypotonia.

However, if the person does get stung by them the person needs to:
Use an ice pack to cool the burn
Go to the hospital
Make sure to be assessed for common severe complications related to scorpion stings, such as acute kidney injury and pancreatitis.
Venom extraction kits were tested and proven to be ineffective in mitigating or preventing envenomation and causes more tissue trauma on the wound area due to the suction of the apparatus.

See also
 Tst26, a potassium channel blocker present in the venom of Tityus stigmurus

References

External links
Video with audio description of the species

stigmurus
Fauna of Brazil
Scorpions described in 1876
Scorpions of South America